Harveya may refer to:

 Harveya (plant), a saprophyte genus
 Harveya (moth), a moth genus